James Owen (December 7, 1784, Bladen County – September 4, 1865, Wilmington) was an American politician from North Carolina, a planter, major-general, businessman, and enslaver of Omar ibn Said. He was educated in private schools in Pittsburg. Subsequently, he was for many years president of the Wilmington and Raleigh Railroad and a major-general of the militia. His brother John Owen was governor of North Carolina. Owen was a member of the North Carolina state legislature in 1808-1811 and a Democrat U.S. Representative from North Carolina's 5th congressional district from 1817 to 1819. He died in 1865 and was interred at Oakdale Cemetery, Wilmington.

References

 
 Appletons' Cyclopædia of American Biography (1900, volume 4)

1784 births
1865 deaths
Democratic-Republican Party members of the United States House of Representatives from North Carolina
19th-century American politicians
American slave owners
Burials at Oakdale Cemetery